The Center for International Blood and Marrow Transplant Research is a collaboration between the National Marrow Donor Program and the Medical College of Wisconsin's International Bone Marrow Transplant Registry and Autologous Blood and Marrow Transplant Registry.

The purpose of the partnership is to enhance large clinical studies across the United States.  CIBMTR hopes improve treatment protocols, patient selection criteria, and understanding of the biology behind transplants, with the "ultimate goal" of reducing morbidity and mortality from bone marrow transplants.  The CIBMTR lists its specific goals as:

 Define key areas for future research in collaboration with leading scientists, physicians and others in the blood and marrow transplant community.
 Secure critical research funding through partnerships with government, industry and other private parties.
 Design and implement clinical studies.
 Offer expertise for the application of biostatistics, database development and study design in blood and marrow transplant.
 Make available research resources including the world's largest clinical database of related blood and marrow transplants, along with repositories of thousands of matched tissue samples from transplant recipients and their donors - including significant numbers of samples for many rare diseases

In addition to providing patient and physician information, they take credit for the publication of nearly 400 scientific journal articles.  However, most of these publications predate the 2004 founding of the organization and were actually the work of its older partners.

References

External links
CIBMTR homepage

Transplant organizations